Group C of UEFA Euro 2000 began on 13 June and ended on 21 June 2000. Spain won the group ahead of FR Yugoslavia. Norway and Slovenia were eliminated.

Teams

Notes

Standings

In the quarter-finals,
The winner of Group C, Spain, advanced to play the runner-up of Group D, France.
The runner-up of Group C, FR Yugoslavia, advanced to play the winner of Group D, Netherlands.

Matches

Spain vs Norway

FR Yugoslavia vs Slovenia

Slovenia vs Spain

Norway vs FR Yugoslavia

FR Yugoslavia vs Spain

Slovenia vs Norway

References

External links
UEFA Euro 2000 Group C

Group C
Group
FR Yugoslavia at UEFA Euro 2000
Norway at UEFA Euro 2000
Slovenia at UEFA Euro 2000